Fabien Canu (born 23 April 1960) is a French judoka. He competed at the 1984 Summer Olympics and the 1988 Summer Olympics.

References

External links
 

1960 births
Living people
French male judoka
Olympic judoka of France
Judoka at the 1984 Summer Olympics
Judoka at the 1988 Summer Olympics
Sportspeople from Seine-Maritime
20th-century French people